Maya Shankar is a cognitive scientist and the creator, host, and executive producer of the podcast, A Slight Change of Plans, made in collaboration with Malcolm Gladwell's production company, Pushkin Industries.

Shankar served as a senior advisor in the Obama White House, where she founded the White House Social and Behavioral Sciences Team, which was formalized by Executive Order 13707 in 2015. Her work at the White House was profiled by The New Yorker in 2017.

Shankar also served as the first Behavioral Science Advisor to the United Nations and is a Director at Google. Maya is a graduate of the pre-college program at the Juilliard School, where she was a private violin student of Itzhak Perlman. When Shankar was a teenager, she injured a tendon in her left hand, bringing her musical career to an end.

Maya Shankar is the daughter of Ramamurti Shankar, Indian theoretical particle physicist and Yale University Professor.

Education
Maya earned her B.A. from Yale University in cognitive science and went on to earn her Ph.D. from the University of Oxford on a Rhodes Scholarship. In 2013, Maya went on to complete her postdoctoral fellowship in cognitive neuroscience at Stanford University.

References

External links 

 

Year of birth missing (living people)
Living people
Alumni of the University of Oxford
Organization founders
Yale University alumni
Nudge theory